Frank Morrison (23 November 1859 – 12 March 1949) was a Canadian trade union leader.

Born in Franktown, Ontario, Morrison grew up in Walkerton, where he became a printer.  In 1886, he moved to Chicago, and there he joined the International Typographical Union.  He qualified in law at Lake Forest University, and joined the Illinois Bar.

Morrison became active in the American Federation of Labor (AFL), within which he was a supporter of Samuel Gompers and the conservative wing of the movement, and he opposed organizing recent immigrants or black workers.  He was first elected as secretary of the AFL in 1897.  In 1919, he attended the conference which founded the International Labour Organization.  He successfully argued for a wide range of labour legislation, for the creation of the Department of Labor, and for the creation of the Social Security system.

In 1936, the role of treasurer was added to Morrison's position in the AFL.  He finally retired in 1939, at the age of eighty, and he died ten years later.

References

1859 births
1949 deaths
Canadian emigrants to the United States
Canadian trade unionists
People from Lanark County
American Federation of Labor people